Mebo is a Tehsil in the Indian state of Arunachal Pradesh. East Siang is the name of the district that contains Tehsil Mebo.

Mebo is located  towards East from District headquarters Pasighat. It is part of Mebo constituency in the Arunachal Pradesh Legislative Assembly and is represented by Lombo Tayeng.

References

Villages in East Siang district